The Brigade: Race to the Hudson (or simply The Brigade) is an American reality television series which debuted on April 22, 2019, on the Outdoor Channel. The series sees 10 strangers cooperate to travel via part of the York Factory Express through Canada to reach York Factory, Manitoba, on Hudson Bay within 28 days, to share in US$500,000. Differentiating itself from other survival reality shows such as Survivor, there were no eliminations or structured challenges along the route, though food and other supplies were provided at predetermined points.

The original premise for the program, when first announced in 2018, was a US$1 million prize to cover the full  York Factory Express route in 10 weeks. However production determined the unfeasibility of contestants being able to achieve this goal and shortened the course. A crew of 35 worked on the program.

The program is sponsored by Bass Pro Shops, produced by Media Headquarters, and distributed by Kew Media Distribution. The distributor hoped to sell the format to European, Australian, New Zealand and Asian broadcasters.

Contestants

Episodes

References 

2019 American television series debuts
2010s American reality television series
2010s American game shows
English-language television shows
Works about survival skills
Outdoor Channel original programming